Stéphane Boudin (28 October 1888 – 18 October 1967) was a French interior designer and a president of Maison Jansen, the influential Paris-based interior decorating firm.

Boudin is best known for being asked by U.S. First Lady Jacqueline Kennedy to join American antiques expert Henry Francis du Pont of the Winterthur Museum and interior designer Sister Parish in the renovation and restoration of the White House from 1961 to 1963. After Boudin impressed the first lady with his initial work in the Red and Blue rooms, Mrs. Kennedy gave him increasing control of the redecoration project, to the consternation of du Pont and Parish.

Jansen is known for designing interiors for Elsie de Wolfe, Henry Channon, the royal families of Yugoslavia, Belgium and Iran, the German Reichsbank during the period of National Socialism, and Leeds Castle in Kent for its last owner, Olive, Lady Baillie. Boudin also decorated Les Ormes, the Washington, D.C. home of Perle Mesta, the U.S. ambassador to Luxembourg, and her sister, Marguerite Tyson; the house and its furnishings eventually were purchased by Lyndon B. Johnson. The Johnsons hired Genevieve Hendricks to integrate a touch of Texas into the Boudin decor because, as Time quoted Johnson as saying, "Every time somebody calls it a château, I lose 50,000 votes back in Texas."

References
 Abbott, James Archer. Jansen Furniture. Acanathus Press: 2007. .
 Abbott, James Archer. Jansen. Acanthus Press: 2006. .
 Abbott James A., and Elaine M. Rice. Designing Camelot: The Kennedy White House Restoration. Van Nostrand Reinhold: 1998. .
 Abbott, James A. A Frenchman in Camelot: The Decoration of the Kennedy White House by Stéphane Boudin. Boscobel Restoration Inc.: 1995. .
 Hampton, Mark. Legendary Decorators of the Twentieth Century. Doubleday: 1992. .
 West, J.B. with Mary Lynn Kotz. Upstairs at the White House: My Life with the First Ladies. Coward, McCann & Geoghegan: 1973. SBN 698-10546-X.
 "Ormes and the Man", Time magazine, November 17, 1961

French interior designers
1888 births
1967 deaths
French designers